Isolde Schmitt-Menzel (11 April 1930 – 4 September 2022) was a German designer, author, illustrator, graphist, and ceramist.

Biography
Schmitt-Menzel studied at the Burg Giebichenstein University of Art and Design in Halle. She wrote books for children as well as methods for practicing ceramics. She co-created the German television show Die Sendung mit der Maus.

Isolde Schmitt-Menzel died in Frankfurt on 4 September 2022 at the age of 92.

Books
Mosaik aus Stein, Glas, Holz, Papier (1968)
Keramik bemalen (1970)
Ton, geformt, bemalt, gebrannt (1970)
Zwölf Wünsche für Elisabeth (1985)
Maus und Bär beim Zahnarzt (1995)
Maus, erzähl mir was von der Schule (1995)
Die Maus sagt dir Gute Nacht (1997)
Die Maus hat Geburtstag (1999)
Die Maus auf dem Bauernhof (2001)
Fingerspiele mit der Maus (2003)

References

1930 births
2022 deaths
German women artists
German illustrators
German ceramists
People from Eisenach